Hans Kuhn may refer to:

 Hans Kuhn (chemist) (1919–2012), German chemist
 Hans Kuhn (philologist) (1899–1988), German philologist